The Swedish Ice Hockey Coach of the Year (Swedish: Årets Coach) has been awarded to the best ice hockey coach in Sweden each season since the 1991–92 season. The award was created in honor of Arne Strömberg, and Kamratföreningen Hockeyjournalisterna is the jury which votes on the award. The award has usually gone to a coach in the top-tier league (SHL/Elitserien), although the award is not specific to the top-tier league.

Winners
 1991–92: Tommy Sandlin, Brynäs IF
 1992–93: Tommy Sandlin (2), Brynäs IF
 1993–94: Kent Forsberg, MoDo Hockey
 1994–95: Sune Bergman, HV71
 1995–96: Lasse Falk, Västra Frölunda HC
 1996–97: Per Bäckman, Färjestad BK
 1997–98: Bo Lennartsson, Färjestad BK
 1998–99: Roger Melin, Brynäs IF
 1999–00: Hardy Nilsson, Djurgårdens IF
 2000–01: Peo Larsson, Timrå IK
 2001–02: Jim Brithén, MoDo Hockey
 2002–03: Conny Evensson, Västra Frölunda HC
 2003–04: Pär Mårts, HV71
 2004–05: Stephan Lundh, Frölunda HC
 2005–06: Bengt-Åke Gustafsson, Sweden men's national ice hockey team
 2006–07: Harald Lückner, Modo Hockey
 2007–08: Kent Johansson, HV71
 2008–09: Per-Erik Johnsson and Tommy Samuelsson, Färjestad BK
 2009–10: Hardy Nilsson (2), Djurgårdens IF
 2010–11: Roger Melin (2), AIK
 2011–12: Tommy Jonsson, Brynäs IF
 2012–13: Peter Andersson, Örebro HK
 2013–14: Hans Wallson, Skellefteå AIK
 2014–15: Per Hånberg, Karlskrona HK
 2015–16: Per-Erik Johnsson (2), Leksands IF
 2016–17: Thomas Berglund, Brynäs IF
 2017–18: Sam Hallam, Växjö Lakers
 2018–19: Håkan Åhlund, IK Oskarshamn
 2019–20: No award due to COVID-19
 2020–21: Fredrik Andersson, Timrå IK

See also
Leader of the Year (ice hockey)

References

 Årets coach - Svenska Ishockeyförbundet (in Swedish)

External links

Swedish Hockey League
1992 establishments in Sweden
Awards established in 1992
Swedish ice hockey trophies and awards
Sweden